Sarah Elizabeth Thomas is an American librarian best known for her leadership positions in a number of research libraries. In May 2013 it was announced that she had been appointed vice president for Harvard University Library; she took up the post in August 2013.

Early life 
Thomas was raised in Haydenville, Massachusetts, United States, and graduated from Smith College in 1970. She qualified as a professional librarian at Simmons College in 1973 and received her Ph.D. from Johns Hopkins University in 1982 for a thesis on the Austrian author Hugo von Hofmannsthal and his relations with his publisher.

Career 
Between 1996 and 2006, Thomas held the positions of adjunct professor of German and Carl A. Kroch University Librarian at Cornell University. Between 2007 and 2013, she held the office of Bodley's Librarian and Director of the Bodleian Libraries at the University of Oxford. As Bodley's Librarian, she was responsible for the operation of the largest university libraries in the United Kingdom, and one of the major research libraries in the world. Her previous experience in major United States research libraries included Harvard's Widener Library, Johns Hopkins, the National Agricultural Library, the Library of Congress, and the Research Libraries Group.

Accomplishments 
She is the first woman to have held the position of Bodley's Librarian, and the second librarian (after her predecessor, Reginald Carr) also to have been in charge of the university's integrated library service (known as "Oxford University Library Services" when it was established in 2000, but renamed "Bodleian Libraries" on March 2, 2010 – Bodley's 465th birthday). Thomas, an American, is also the first foreign librarian to have run the Bodleian. In an interview she gave shortly after taking up the position, she recalled visiting Oxford when she was working at the Library of Congress to speak at the Sheldonian Theatre. She said that she remembered thinking "I could just die then and be happy".  When recruitment consultants approached her about applying for the post and she saw the job description, she said, "it was love at first sight. It was everything I wanted to do, but bigger. Integration, the digital library, the estates programme, the opportunity to be inside a truly magnificent institution and have a role at a pivotal moment in its history – that was just too enticing for me."

In 2007, Thomas was awarded the Melvil Dewey Medal of the American Library Association, and in 2010 was awarded the Smith College Medal. She was elected a Member of the American Philosophical Society in 2013.

Personal life 
Thomas is married to Peter B. Hirtle, an archivist. They have two sons.

References

External links 
 Cornell's University Librarians: Sarah Thomas
 Full text of doctoral thesis via Oxford Research Archive

American librarians
Bodley's Librarians
American women librarians
Harvard University librarians
Members of the American Philosophical Society
People associated with the Bodleian Library
American women academics
Cornell University faculty
Smith College alumni
Simmons University alumni
Johns Hopkins University alumni
Year of birth missing (living people)
Living people
People from Williamsburg, Massachusetts
Academic librarians
21st-century American women